Al-Taybah  is a Syrian village located in Markaz Rif Dimashq, Rif Dimashq. According to the Syria Central Bureau of Statistics (CBS), Al-Taybah had a population of 4,008 in the 2004 census.

History
In 1838, Eli Smith noted Al-Taybah's population as  being Sunni Muslims.

References

Bibliography

 

Populated places in Markaz Rif Dimashq District